Hubert is an unincorporated community in the eastern portion of Onslow County, North Carolina, United States, near the city of Swansboro. Hubert is part of the Jacksonville Metropolitan Statistical Area. The community is on the northeast side of Marine Corps Base Camp Lejeune. Hubert's zip code is 28539.

Geography 
According to the United States Census Bureau the Hubert zip code has an area of 48.96 sq mi. The zip code had a population of 15,469 at the 2010 census.

References

Unincorporated communities in Onslow County, North Carolina
Unincorporated communities in North Carolina